Plac Konstytucji, or Constitution Square in English, is a major square situated in the central Śródmieście district of Warsaw, Poland.

Overview
The square was constructed in the initial post-war years on the Marszałkowska street as a main element of social realist urban project, based on the designs of Jankowski, Knothe, Sigalin and Stępiński. Together with the Palace of Culture and Science it was the main architectural social realist investment of Warsaw in 1949–1956. Its name comes from the Stalinist constitution adopted in communist Poland in July 1952. Architects envisaged the square to be the final point of First of May parades.

In 1999 a group headed by the Polish deputy foreign minister, Radosław Sikorski launched a campaign to rename the square after former U.S. president Ronald Reagan.  The campaign was unsuccessful and the square is one of the last in the capital linked to the Communist period. Subsequently, the Warsaw authorities installed a plaque on the square explaining it is named after the many constitutions enacted in Polish history.

References

Further reading 

 Krzysztof Mordyński: Bierut i kandelabry na placu Konstytucji w Warszawie, „Kronika Warszawy”, 2008, nr 1, ss. 60–67.
 Krzysztof Mordyński: Plac Konstytucji w Warszawie - eksperyment "wielkomiejskiego" socrealizmu, "Spotkania z Zabytkami", 2008, nr 2, ss. 3–7.
 Józef Sigalin: Warszawa 1944-1980. Z archiwum architekta, t. 2, Warszawa 1986, PIW,  - a tam rodz. VII pt. 1950-1952 Marszałkowska Dzielnica Mieszkaniowa

Konstytucji
Stalinist architecture
Śródmieście, Warsaw